The black knobby newt (Tylototriton asperrimus) is a species of salamanders in the family Salamandridae found in China and Vietnam.  Its natural habitats are subtropical or tropical moist lowland forests, subtropical or tropical moist montane forests, freshwater marshes, and intermittent freshwater marshes. It is threatened by habitat loss and overharvesting.

References 

Tylototriton
Amphibians of China
Amphibians of Vietnam
Taxonomy articles created by Polbot
Amphibians described in 1930